Louise Henriëtte Maria "Loes" Schutte (born 12 June 1953) is a retired Dutch rower. Her teams finished fourth at the 1975 World Championships and eights at the 1976 Summer Olympics in the women's eight event.

References

1953 births
Living people
Dutch female rowers
Olympic rowers of the Netherlands
Rowers at the 1976 Summer Olympics
People from Zandvoort
Sportspeople from North Holland